Mikhalina Anatolyevna Lysova (born 29 March 1992) is a Russian visually impaired cross-country skier and biathlete. She has represented Russia at the Paralympics in 2010 and in 2014 competing in the cross-country skiing and biathlon events. She progressed to become one of the most consistent Paralympics Nordic skiers of Russia as she claimed 16 medals in her Paralympic career including 6 gold medals. She was also the recipient of the Order For Merit to the Fatherland and Order of Friendship awards.

Early life
Mikhalina Lysova was born on 29 March 1992 and had a weak vision since her birth. Her father worked as a fitter and her mother worked in a kindergarten. She was encouraged to take the sport of skiing by her elder sister, Aleksandra Lysova, in 2002 when she was just ten years old though her parents did not like it. She was married to a Ukrainian Paralympic Nordic skier, Dmytro Shulga, who has represented Ukraine at the Paralympics in 2010 and 2014.

Career
Lysova made her first Paralympic appearance during the 2010 Winter Paralympics representing Russia and had a successful Paralympic event claiming 5 medals in her debut Paralympic event including a gold medal and 2 silver medals in the cross-country skiing events and 2 bronze medals in the biathlon events. She was awarded the IPC Athlete of the Month for April in 2011 due to consistent performances at the 2011 IPC Biathlon and Cross-Country Skiing World Championships as she claimed 7 medals in the World Championships.

She was also qualified to compete at the 2014 Winter Paralympics which was held in Russia and claimed 6 medals in the Paralympic event including 2 gold, 1 silver medals in the biathlon events and 1 gold, 2 silver medals in the cross-country skiing events. Mikhalina Lysova was also the flagbearer for Russia at the closing ceremony during the 2014 Winter Paralympics.

She represented Neutral Paralympic Athletes at the 2018 Winter Paralympics as Russia was suspended and banned from competing at the 2018 Winter Paralympics due to doping scandal. Mikhalina Lysova claimed her 5th Paralympic gold medal after clinched a gold medal in the women's 6km individual event during the 2018 Winter Paralympics, which is also her third gold Paralympic gold medal in biathlon events.

Defamation lawsuit
In April 2018 after the conclusion of the 2018 Winter Paralympics on 18 March 2018, a German daily newspaper called Bild, falsely claimed Mikhalina Lysova for doping by blaming her for being indifferent to fellow Russian athletes who have been caught for doping issues and also filed a complaint against her at a court. The newspaper also believed that Mikhalina would have used banned substances to boost her performance at the 2018 Winter Paralympics where she managed to pick up 5 medals. However, Mikhalina Lysova managed to prove herself as an honest and innocent person after winning the court case against the German newspaper.

References

External links 

 

1992 births
Living people
People from Nizhny Tagil
Russian female cross-country skiers
Russian female biathletes
Cross-country skiers at the 2010 Winter Paralympics
Cross-country skiers at the 2014 Winter Paralympics
Cross-country skiers at the 2018 Winter Paralympics
Biathletes at the 2010 Winter Paralympics
Biathletes at the 2014 Winter Paralympics
Biathletes at the 2018 Winter Paralympics
Paralympic cross-country skiers of Russia
Paralympic biathletes of Russia
Paralympic gold medalists for Russia
Paralympic silver medalists for Russia
Paralympic bronze medalists for Russia
Medalists at the 2010 Winter Paralympics
Medalists at the 2014 Winter Paralympics
Medalists at the 2018 Winter Paralympics
Visually impaired category Paralympic competitors
Paralympic medalists in cross-country skiing
Paralympic medalists in biathlon
Sportspeople from Sverdlovsk Oblast
Russian blind people